Kim Seon-dong (Korean: 김선동, born 9 October 1963) is a South Korean politician who served as the Secretary-General of the United Future Party (UFP; People Power Party since 2 September 2020) from 28 May 2020 until his resignation on 14 October 2020. Prior to this, he was the Member of the National Assembly for Dobong 2nd constituency (2008-2012; 2016-2020).

Career 
Kim entered to politics as the Administrative Secretary of the Office of the President under Kim Young-sam cabinet. He was also an aide to the Grand National Party (GNP) presidential candidate Lee Hoi-chang during the 2002 presidential election.

He was firstly elected to the National Assembly in 2008 election, defeating the United Democratic Party (UDP) candidate Yoo In-tae. However, he lost to Yoo in 2012 election; he could only made a comeback when Yoo was not selected the Democratic candidate prior to 2016 election.

He is a pro-Park Geun-hye figure but not a hardliner. During the 1st term as an MP, he was a member of Minbon 21, a GNP sub-group formed by its 1st term reformist MPs.

In 2019, he unsuccessfully contested for the Liberty Korea Party (LKP) parliamentary leadership. In 2020 election, he contested under the United Future Party (UFP) banner but lost to Oh Ki-hyung, whom he used to defeat 4 years ago. On 28 May, he was appointed the Secretary-General of the UFP, replacing the incumbent Park Wan-soo. He resigned from the position on 14 October.

Election results

General elections

References

External links 
 Official website
 Kim Seon-dong on Facebook
 Kim Seon-dong on Twitter
 Kim Seon-dong on Blog

1963 births
Living people
Members of the National Assembly (South Korea)
Liberty Korea Party politicians
Korea University alumni
People from Wonju
People Power Party (South Korea) politicians